Drillia worthingtoni is a species of sea snail, a marine gastropod mollusc in the family Drilliidae.

Description

Distribution
This marine species occurs off the Andaman Islands.

References

  Tucker, J.K. 2004 Catalog of recent and fossil turrids (Mollusca: Gastropoda). Zootaxa 682:1-1295

External links
 

worthingtoni
Gastropods described in 1904